Allah Bukhsh Karim Bukhsh Brohi (1915 – 1987) known as A.K. Brohi) was a prominent Pakistani politician and lawyer. He originated from Shikarpur in Sindh. He was the first partner, and mentor of famous Indian lawyer Ram Jethmalani as acknowledged in his authorized biography.

He also served as the High Commissioner of Pakistan to India from 1 February 1960 to 31 March 1961.

Career
A.K. Brohi was close to military ruler Zia-ul-Haq and his brand of politics and he has been called "the intellectual behind the General".

He was a scholar and author affiliated with the Traditionalist School of metaphysics (more precisely René Guénon, Frithjof Schuon and Martin Lings).

Brohi served briefly as Attorney-General for Pakistan besides Sharifuddin Pirzada who served as Attorney General during most of General Zia-ul-Haq's regime (1977 – 1988).

A.K. Brohi also served for a while as Minister of Law and Justice in General Zia-ul-Haq's regime in the late 1970s.

Brohi wrote a long preface for the book of Brigadier General S. K. Malik (i. e. Malik ul-Khan) The Quranic Concept of War (1979), a manual of the brigadier's impression of military tactics from early Islamic times, which has been reprinted in Pakistan and India.

Family
His younger brother, Ali Ahmad Brohi, who died in 2003, was also a writer and scholar, more particularly on Sindhi culture.

His sister Husn Afroze was married to veteran politician Qaim Ali Shah, but died of breast cancer in 1977.

Publications

Books
Islam in the Modern World
The Fundamental Law of Pakistan (1958)
A Faith to Live By
Testament of faith
Adventures in Self-Expression

Booklets
The Qurʼān and its impact on human history
The poetry of Shah Abdul Latif
Religious way of life

Articles
Iqbal and the concept of Islamic socialism in Al-'Ilm, v40 n11 (Sep 1991):38-47

Awards and recognition
One of the founding members of the Pakistan Academy of Letters. He was nominated in recognition of his services to Pakistani languages and literature (especially philosophy).

References

External links
 A.K. Brohi: Insights Into a Legal Mind

1915 births
1987 deaths
Sindhi people
High Commissioners of Pakistan to India
Law Ministers of Pakistan
Attorneys General of Pakistan
Pakistani lawyers
20th-century Pakistani lawyers
People from Lahore